The Canal de l'Oise à l'Aisne (literally Canal of the Oise to the Aisne) is a summit level canal in the Hauts-de-France region (northern France), formerly Picardy. It connects the Canal latéral à l'Aisne at Abbécourt to the Canal latéral à l'Oise at Bourg-et-Comin.

En route
PK 0 Junction with Canal latéral à l'Aisne at Abbécourt 
PK 25.5 Pinon
PK 35 Pargny-Filain
Summit level reservoir, Bassin de Monampteuil
PK 38-40.5 Braye-en-Laonnois tunnel (2365m)    to     
PK 48 Junction with Canal latéral à l'Oise at Bourg-et-Comin

See also
List of canals in France

References

External links 
 Canal de l'Oise à l'Aisne navigation guide; places, ports and moorings on the canal, by the author of Inland Waterways of France, Imray
 Navigation details for 80 French rivers and canals (French waterways website section)

Canals in France
Canals opened in 1890